The Daxi Creek is a tributary of the Xitiao River in Anji County of Zhejiang Province, China. It is interrupted by the Tianhuangping Dam.

References

Rivers of Zhejiang